Ein Harod was a kibbutz in northern Israel near Mount Gilboa. Founded in 1921, it became the center of Mandatory Palestine's kibbutz movement, hosting the headquarters of the largest kibbutz organisation, HaKibbutz HaMeuhad.

In 1923 part of the community split off into Tel Yosef, and in 1952 the rest of the community split into Ein Harod (Ihud) and Ein Harod (Meuhad).

It was named after the nearby spring then known in Arabic as Ain Jalut, "Spring of Goliath", Hebraized as "Ein Harod", now Ma'ayan Harod. It was built on land formerly belonging to the villages of Qumya and Tamra.

History

Middle Ages
The original kibbutz was located near the 1260 battlefield of Ayn Jalut, a battle in which the Mongols suffered their first defeat at the hands of the Mamluks, which arguably saved the Mamluk sultanate from annihilation.

The kibbutz's first location
The kibbutz was founded in 1921 by Russian Jewish pioneers of the Third Aliyah.

In 1921, members of the Gdud HaAvoda "Work Battalion", at a time when their road work was decreasing, set up a work camp in the Harod Valley, the eastern extension of the Jezreel Valley, at the foot of Mount Gilboa. In 1921, 35 young people from the Gdud pitched tents at the Harod Spring. The group, led by Shlomo Levkovitch (Lavi), began to farm land which the Palestine Land Development Company had purchased from the Arab village of Nuris, in the eastern part of the Jezreel Valley. The Gdud members worked here at draining the swamps, a permanent source of malaria.
According to a census conducted in 1922 by the British Mandate authorities, Ein Harod had a population of 244 Jews.

The Tel Yosef-Ein Harod group split in July 1923 over differences concerning economic autonomy, with two-thirds of the group settling Tel Yosef and the rest, Ein Harod. While it's sometimes considered that Ein Ḥarod was founded in 1921 and Tel Yosef in 1923, together they formed one farming unit.

Leadership of Kibbutz movement
In 1924, the Ein Harod group was joined by members of the Havurat HaEmek group. In 1925, under the leadership of Yitzhak Tabenkin, Ein Harod became the center of countrywide kibbutz movement joined by members of Yagur, Ashdot Yaakov and Ayelet HaShahar, forming the basis of HaKibbutz HaMeuhad.

Ein Harod became the organizational headquarters of the movement. In 1926, during a breakup of the Gdud HaAvoda along ideological faultlines separating the Marxists from the more moderate leftists, Ein Harod and Tel Yosef ceased their close cooperation.

Permanent location
In 1930, when the collective moved to a permanent location at the foot of Kumi Hill, the kibbutz had 239 members.

The village played an important role in the defence of the area during the 1936–1939 Arab revolt in Palestine, known by the Jews of the era as "the disturbances," during which it was the base of Orde Wingate's Special Night Squads. In 1945 the Haganah had a small prison there in which they detained members of the Irgun during the Season. However, on 29 June 1946, as part of Operation Agatha, the British army occupied the kibbutz by force. By 1947 it had a population of 1,120.

Ideological split
In 1952, in the wake of ideological differences between supporters of the two main socialist parties, Mapai and Mapam, the kibbutz split, creating two separate kibbutzim: Ein Harod (Ihud), affiliated with Mapai and belonging to Ihud HaKvutzot veHaKibbutzim; and Ein Harod (Meuhad), affiliated with Mapam and belonging to HaKibbutz HaMeuhad. Today both kibbutzim belong to the United Kibbutz Movement.

Museums

Mishkan Museum of Art (full name:   Ein Harod Art Museum) is one of the first art museums in Israel.  The museum was founded in 1937 as an "art corner" during the early years of the kibbutz in the belief that culture and art were among the essential components of a society. The artworks were initially displayed in the art studio owned by Haim Atar, a small wooden hut. A new, imposing, museum building, designed by an architect , was inaugurated in 1948. During construction of the museum, the 1952 Mapai/Mapam split happened, but the museum was preserved as the joint institution for the split kibbuzim. The museum was declared as a "heritage site" by the Council for Conservation of Heritage Sites in Israel.

 houses a collection of archaeology and artifacts related to local history of the area.

Notable people
Yosef Alon
Meir Har-Zion (1934–2014), military commando
Shlomo Lavi, founding member; Zionist activist and politician, originator of the larger kibbutz settlement form
Avraham Shlonsky (1900–1973), founding member; Hebrew literary stylist, author, translator and editor
Yitzhak Tabenkin (1888–1971), founding member; Zionist activist and politician, co-founder of the Kibbutz Movement
Aharon Zisling
 (1902-1953), painter, one of the founders of Ein Harod
Aviva Rabinovich-Vin (אביבה רבינוביץ'-וין), professor of botany, chief scientist at the Israel Nature and Parks Authority  and an environmental activist, was born here

See also
Israeli art

References

External links
Museum of Art Ein Harod
Beit Shturman 
Ein Harod, circa 1921
Ein Harod, circa 1925
Railway station near Ein Harod, circa 1929

Gilboa Regional Council
Populated places established in 1921
Populated places established in 1930
Jewish villages in Mandatory Palestine
1921 establishments in Mandatory Palestine
1930 establishments in Mandatory Palestine